Ernst Krebs may refer to:
 Ernst Krebs (canoeist)
 Ernst Krebs (wrestler)
 Ernst T. Krebs, American conman and biochemist